In mathematics, the Bruhat decomposition (introduced by  François Bruhat for classical groups and by Claude Chevalley in general) G = BWB of certain algebraic groups G into cells can be regarded as a general expression of the principle of Gauss–Jordan elimination, which generically writes a matrix as a product of an upper triangular and lower triangular matrices—but with exceptional cases. It is related to the Schubert cell decomposition of flag varieties: see Weyl group for this.

More generally, any group with a (B, N) pair has a Bruhat decomposition.

Definitions
G is a connected, reductive algebraic group over an algebraically closed field.
B is a Borel subgroup of G
W is a Weyl group of G corresponding to a maximal torus of B.

The Bruhat decomposition of G is the decomposition

of G as a disjoint union of double cosets of B parameterized by the elements of the Weyl group W. (Note that although W is not in general a subgroup of G, the coset wB is still well defined because the maximal torus is contained in B.)

Examples 
Let G be the general linear group GLn of invertible  matrices with entries in some algebraically closed field, which is a reductive group. Then the Weyl group W is isomorphic to the symmetric group Sn on n letters, with permutation matrices as representatives. In this case, we can take B to be the subgroup of upper triangular invertible matrices, so Bruhat decomposition says that one can write any invertible matrix A as a product U1PU2 where U1 and U2 are upper triangular, and P is a permutation matrix. Writing this as P = U1−1AU2−1, this says that any invertible matrix can be transformed into a permutation matrix via a series of row and column operations, where we are only allowed to add row i (resp. column i) to row j (resp. column j) if i > j (resp. i < j). The row operations correspond to U1−1, and the column operations correspond to U2−1.

The special linear group SLn of invertible  matrices with determinant 1 is a semisimple group, and hence reductive. In this case, W is still isomorphic to the symmetric group Sn. However, the determinant of a permutation matrix is the sign of the permutation, so to represent an odd permutation in SLn, we can take one of the nonzero elements to be −1 instead of 1. Here B is the subgroup of upper triangular matrices with determinant 1, so the interpretation of Bruhat decomposition in this case is similar to the case of GLn.

Geometry 
The cells in the Bruhat decomposition correspond to the Schubert cell decomposition of flag varieties. The dimension of the cells corresponds to the length of the word w in the Weyl group. Poincaré duality constrains the topology of the cell decomposition, and thus the algebra of the Weyl group; for instance, the top dimensional cell is unique (it represents the fundamental class), and corresponds to the longest element of a Coxeter group.

Computations
The number of cells in a given dimension of the Bruhat decomposition are the coefficients of the q-polynomial of the associated Dynkin diagram.

Double Bruhat Cells

With two opposite Borels one may intersect the Bruhat cells for each of them.

See also
 Lie group decompositions
 Birkhoff factorization, a special case of the Bruhat decomposition for affine groups.
 Cluster algebra

Notes

References
Borel, Armand. Linear Algebraic Groups (2nd ed.). New York: Springer-Verlag, 1991. .
Bourbaki, Nicolas, Lie Groups and Lie Algebras: Chapters 4–6 (Elements of Mathematics), Springer-Verlag, 2008. 

Lie groups
Algebraic groups